The kalaság is a large rectangular wooden shield used by precolonial Filipinos. The shield is made of hardwood and is decorated with intricate carvings and an elaborate rattan binding on the front. The wood comes from native trees such as the dapdap, polay and sablang. Its base is composed of rattan wood which is strengthened by the application of resin coating that turned rock-hard upon drying.

It was widely used throughout the Philippines for warfare. Datu Lapulapu was reported to have used this shield during the Battle of Mactan in 1521. In the Panay Bukidnon folk epic Hinilawod, the heroes in the story are depicted rigorously training, carrying, and fighting with the kalasag. The shield can also be used in an offensive manner. When the character Dumalapdap was being surrounded by a crowd of maidens, he "struck them with his shield" and "drove them with his shield" before threatening them further with his spear.    Its shape is commonly used as part of the official seal of the Philippine National Police. Various kinds of kalasag are also represented in the provincial flags of Bukidnon, Maguindanao, and Mountain Province.

The officers who bears the royal regalia of the Sultan of Brunei such as the Panglima Asgar, Perwira Asgar and the Hulubalang Asgar  carry the royal weapons of kalasak (shield) and kampilan (sword).

See also 
Kampilan
Taming

References

See also 
 Filipino Martial Arts
 Arnis

Shields
Visayan culture
Visayan history
Arnis
Moro people
Weapons of the Philippines
Tagalog words and phrases